Certified is the fourth album by trumpeter Herb Robertson which was recorded and released in 1991 on the JMT label.

Reception
The AllMusic review by Ron Wynn states, "Trumpeter Herb Robertson doesn't plug into any musical trend, whether it's hard bop, repertory, or fusion. He's among a handful of contemporary players who defy easy compartmentalization while striving for their own voice and sound".

Track listing
All compositions by Herb Robertson
 "Friendly Fire" - 8:15 	
 "Cosmic Child" - 12:24 	
 "Don't Be Afraid We're Not Like the Others" - 14:40
 "Eastawesta" - 9:53
 "Seeking Seeds in the Blues Bazaar" - 17:38
 "Ghostsongs" - 7:50
 "The Condensed Version" - 3:03

Personnel
Herb Robertson - trumpet, flugelhorn, pocket trumpet, cornet, valve trombone, vocals
David Taylor - bass trombone, voice
Mack Goldsbury - tenor saxophone, soprano saxophone, clarinet, vocals, voice
Ed Schuller - bass, tuning fork
Phil Haynes - drums, percussion, bells, wind chimes, one-half plastic Peking Duck sack, crowbar, magic carpet, multitrack plastic tape cover, doorman's black umbrella

References 

1991 albums
Herb Robertson albums
JMT Records albums
Winter & Winter Records albums